Zone 9 may refer to:

Travelcard Zones 7-9, of the Transport for London zonal system
Hardiness zone, a geographically defined zone in which a specific category of plant life is capable of growing
Zone 9 of Milan
Zone 9 bloggers, a blogging group from Ethiopia